The Abbotsford Centre, formerly Abbotsford Entertainment and Sports Centre, is a 7,000-seat multi-purpose arena in Abbotsford, British Columbia. The arena was expected to cost $64.7 million. Construction began on September 24, 2007. As of 2023, it is the home of the Abbotsford Canucks of the American Hockey League (AHL) after previously hosting AHL's Abbotsford Heat from 2009 to 2014.

History
On September 25, 2006, Abbotsford council voted unanimously to hold a referendum asking voters to borrow $85 million to fund three community projects, including a new entertainment and sports centre. The arena was approved by Abbotsford voters on November 25, 2006, with a 54.8% majority.

With the loss of the Heat, Abbotsford Centre announced it would start a recreational ice hockey league to help fill open dates left at the arena.  Each team in the Abbotsford Centre Hockey League is to play 20 games per team during the 2014-15 hockey season.

On May 2, 2018, the Canadian Elite Basketball League announced that the Fraser Valley Bandits would be coming to the Abbotsford Centre in 2019, with the basketball season to be from May to August. On September 23, 2021 – The Fraser Valley Bandits announced that the club has chosen the Langley Events Centre (LEC) in Langley, BC as its home for the Canadian Elite Basketball League (CEBL) season, which begins May 2022. 

On May 6, 2021, the Vancouver Canucks were approved to relocate their AHL affiliate to the Abbotsford Centre for the 2021–22 season, where the team became the Abbotsford Canucks.

Arena amenities
The arena has a capacity of 7,000 seats for hockey with room for expansion to 8,500. There are 300 club seats, 15 boxes, 20 private suites, and 2 party suites.

References

External links
Abbotsford Centre

Abbotsford Canucks
Abbotsford Heat
Buildings and structures in Abbotsford, British Columbia
Indoor arenas in British Columbia
Indoor ice hockey venues in Canada
Sports venues in British Columbia
2009 establishments in British Columbia
Sports venues completed in 2009